The 1900 Maryland Aggies football team represented Maryland Agricultural College (later part of the University of Maryland) in the 1900 college football season. In their first and only season under head coach F. H. Peters, the Aggies compiled a 3–4–1 record and outscored their opponents, 68 to 67. The team did not play any intercollegiate football games in 1900, with all eight games being played against local high schools, preparatory schools, an athletic club, and a military academy (Charlotte Hall Military Academy).

Schedule

References

Maryland
Maryland Terrapins football seasons
Maryland Aggies football